Dahgal is a village of Rawalpindi District in the Punjab province of Pakistan on Adiyala road. It is located at 33.4920° N, 73.0479° E with an altitude of 418 metres and lies south of the district capital, Rawalpindi near Central Jail Rawalpindi, also known as Adiala Jail.

Telecommunication 
The PTCL provides the main network of landline telephone. Many ISPs and all major mobile phone, Wireless companies operating in Pakistan provide service in Dahgal.

Languages 
Punjabi is the main language of Dahgal. Other languages include Urdu, Pothohari and rarely spoken language Pashto.

References 

Villages in Rawalpindi District